Mihalaki Georgiev (August 11, 1854 – February 14, 1916) was a Bulgarian writer, diplomat, and social figure. He was born in Vidin and died in Sofia. He attended the Tabor Industrial-Agricultural School from 1872 to 1874, and in 1880 was one of the founding members of the Slavic Tribune. He served as ambassador in Belgrade and Vienna, beginning in 14 November 1896 and lasting until 1899. From 1906 to 1908 he served as the chief editors of the Balkan Tribune.

His writing was influenced by the Russian Narodnik movement.

Works
 Така се лъже човек. Хумореска (1899)
 „Три срещи. Спомени от миналото (1899)
 „От късмета е всичко на този свят (1904)
 „Разкази и хуморески. т. I, т. II, with preface by Ivan Vazov (1919, 1921)

References

Further reading
 Bakratcheva, A. (1992). Similarities in Divergences. Narrative Parallels in the Works of Oliver Goldsmith and Mihalaki Georgiev (Близост в отличията. Особености на повествованието у Михалаки Георгиев и Оливър Голдсмит) - In: Ezik i Literatura, Sofia, 2.

External links
 

1854 births
1916 deaths
Bulgarian writers
People from Vidin